Wanata State Park Picnic Shelter is a historic building located south of Peterson, Iowa, United States. Dr. E.W. Spaulding from Peterson was instrumental in acquiring the property for the park, which was dedicated in 1934. Civilian Conservation Corps Company 778 built the shelter on the slope of a hill that descends to the Little Sioux River. The rear and side walls are composed of random rubble stone. There are four stone pillars across the front, and four vertical timbers attached to them that support the eaves of the gable roof. Each side wall has a doorway and window opening. A fireplace and chimney are centered on the rear wall. There is a small stone basement in the northwest corner, and cemented stone covers the floor of the shelter. It was listed on the National Register of Historic Places in 1990.

References

Government buildings completed in 1934
Civilian Conservation Corps in Iowa
Rustic architecture in Iowa
Buildings and structures in Clay County, Iowa
National Register of Historic Places in Clay County, Iowa
Park buildings and structures on the National Register of Historic Places in Iowa
1934 establishments in Iowa
Picnic shelters